The Review of African Political Economy is a peer-reviewed academic journal covering African political economy. It was founded with the help of Lionel Cliffe and is published quarterly by Taylor & Francis since 1974. It focuses in particular on the political economy of inequality, exploitation, and oppression, whether driven by global forces or local ones (such as class, race, community and gender), and to materialist interpretations of change in Africa.

The editor-in-chief is Janet Bujra (University of Bradford).

According to the Journal Citation Reports, the journal has a 2019 impact factor of 0.988, ranking it 118th out of 181 journals in the category "Political Science".

References

External links 
 

African studies journals
Publications established in 1974
English-language journals
Economics journals
Quarterly journals
Political science journals
Political economy